Bennett Martin Wolf (born October 23, 1959) is a Canadian former professional ice hockey player who played 30 games in the National Hockey League for the Pittsburgh Penguins.

Wolf was born in Kitchener, Ontario.

External links

1959 births
Living people
Canadian ice hockey defencemen
Ice hockey people from Ontario
Sportspeople from Kitchener, Ontario
Pittsburgh Penguins players
Pittsburgh Penguins draft picks